Shuvo Roy is an American scientist and engineer of Southeast Asian descent.

Early Life and education
Roy received most of his education in Uganda, where his father worked as a public health physician.

Roy later completed his education and earned his BS degree from University of Mount Union, Ohio in 1992. He then earned his MS degree in Electrical Engineering and Applied Physics from Case Western Reserve University in 1995. He went on to earn his PhD degree from the same school in 2001.

Career

Roy has developed silicon nanopore membranes (SNM) to achieve high-efficiency blood ultrafiltration while selectively retaining specific solutes and serving as an immunoprotective barrier for encapsulated cells. The SNM are the fundamental underlying technology for the development of an implantable bioartificial kidney.

Using this technology, he has shown feasibility for an implantable bioartificial pancreas (iBAP). Previous attempts to develop a bioartificial pancreas have been severely limited by insufficient mass transfer and a limited supply of beta cells, but Roy says that ultra-high hydraulic permeability characteristic of the SNM will enable appropriate mass transport (especially oxygen, glucose, and insulin) to achieve optimal beta cell performance, while the ultra-selective pore characteristic of the SNM enable unprecedented immunoisolation. Also the iBAP can utilize a human stem cell derived fully functional beta cell that provides and unlimited supply of beta cells.

He is a founding member of the University of California, San Francisco Pediatric Device Consortium.

Professional positions

 1998–2002 Project Staff, Department of Biomedical Engineering, Cleveland Clinic
 1998–2008 Co-Director, BioMEMS Laboratory, Cleveland Clinic
 2000–2008 Faculty, Spine Research Laboratory, Cleveland Clinic
 2001–2008 Assistant Professor, Applied Biomedical Engineering Program, Cleveland State University
 2001–2008 Clinical Assistant Professor, Department of Electrical Engineering and Computer Science, Case Western Reserve University
 2002–2008 Assistant Staff, Department of Biomedical Engineering, Cleveland Clinic
 2006–2008 Assistant Professor, Department of Molecular Medicine, Cleveland Clinic Lerner College of Medicine, Case Western Reserve University
 2009-2011 Adjunct Associate Staff, Departments of Nephrology and Biomedical Engineering, Cleveland Clinic
 2008-2013 Associate Professor, Department of Bioengineering and Therapeutic Sciences, University of California, San Francisco
 2013-now Professor, Department of Bioengineering and Therapeutic Sciences, University of California, San Francisco
 Faculty affiliate of the California Institute for Quantitative Biosciences.
 Director and Principal Investigator, Biomedical Microdevices Laboratory, University of California, San Francisco

Book chapters
 M. Mehregany and S. Roy, "Introduction to MEMS", in Microengineering for Aerospace Systems, H. Helvajian, Ed., Aerospace Press, Los Angeles, CA, USA, 1999
 S. Roy, L.A. Ferrara, A.J. Fleischman, and E.C. Benzel, "MEMS and Neurosurgery", in Encyclopedia of BioMEMS and Bionanotechnology – Volume III: BioMEMS and Biomedical Nanotechnology, T.A. Desai, S. Bhatia, and M. Ferrari, Eds., Springer, New York, NY, USA, 2006
 W.H. Fissell, S. Roy, A.J. Fleischman, and H.D. Humes, “Cell Therapy of Renal Failure”, in Cell Therapy, D. Garcia-Olmo, J.M. Garcia-Verdugo, J. Alemany, and J.A. Gutierrez-Fuentes, Eds., McGraw-Hill, Madrid, SPAIN, 2008
 A.J. Fleischman, S. Srivanas, C. Chandrana, and S. Roy, “Miniature High Frequency Focused Ultrasonic Transducers for Minimally Invasive Imaging Procedures”, in Biomedical Applications of Electroactive Polymer Actuators, F. Carpi and E. Smela, Eds., John Wiley and Sons, Chichester, West Sussex, UK, 2009

Honors and awards
 2003 MIT TR100 Award, Top 100 Young Innovators, Technology Review Magazine
 2004 NASA Group Achievement Award, Harsh Environment MEMS
 Harry Wm. and Diana V. Hind Distinguished Professorship in Pharmaceutical Sciences II in the University of California, San Francisco School of Pharmacy.
 KidneyX Redesign Dialysis prize.

References

Further reading

External links
 

American scientists
American engineers
American people of Bangladeshi descent
Bangladeshi emigrants to the United States
Living people
Cleveland State University people
University of California, San Francisco faculty
Case Western Reserve University people
Year of birth missing (living people)